Tomáš Cibulec and Jaroslav Levinský were the defending champions, but only Levinský chose to participate this year.
He competed with Lovro Zovko, however they lost to Frank Moser and Lukáš Rosol in the quarterfinal.
Pablo Cuevas and David Marrero won in the final 6–4, 6–3, against Moser and Rosol.

Seeds

Draw

Draw

References
 Main Draw

Tennis Napoli Cup - Doubles
2009 Doubles